Ali Jimale Ahmed is a Somali poet, essayist, scholar, and short story writer. He hails from the Abgaal sub clan of Hawiye

Biography
Ahmed holds a Ph.D. from the University of California, Los Angeles (UCLA). Current and former chair of Comparative Literature at Queens College, he teaches courses in African, Middle Eastern, and European literature. His poetry and short stories have also been translated into several languages, including Japanese and the languages spoken in the former Yugoslavia. His books include The Invention of Somalia (Red Sea Press, 1995), Daybreak Is Near: Literature, Clans, and the Nation-State in Somalia (Red Sea Press, 1996), and Fear Is a Cow (Red Sea Press, 2002).

Ahmed currently teaches Comparative Literature at Queens College and the Graduate Center of the City University of New York.

Publications
The Invention of Somalia, (The Red Sea Press: 1995), 
Daybreak is Near: Literature, Clans, and the Nation-state in Somalia, (Red Sea Press: 1997), 
Fear is a Cow, (The Red Sea Press: 2002), 
Diaspora Blues, (The Red Sea Press: 2005), 
The Road Less Traveled: Reflections On The Literatures Of The Horn Of Africa , (The Red Sea Press: 2008),

References
Ali Jimale Ahmed, The Invention of Somalia, (The Red Sea Press: 1995), 
Ali JImale Ahmed, Daybreak is Near: Literature, Clans, and the Nation-state in Somalia, (Red Sea Press: 1997), 
Ali Jimale Ahmed, Fear is a Cow, (The Red Sea Press: 2002), 
Ali Jimale Ahmed, Diaspora Blues, (The Red Sea Press: 2005),

External links
Queens College - Department of Comparative Literature - Ali Jimale Ahmed

American people of Somali descent
Living people
City University of New York faculty
Somalian non-fiction writers
University of California, Los Angeles alumni
Somalists
Year of birth missing (living people)